Sullivan "Pete" Mills Jr. (born May 29, 1942) is a former American football wide receiver who played two seasons with the Buffalo Bills of the American Football League. He was drafted by the Buffalo Bills in the twelfth round of the 1965 AFL Draft. He first enrolled at Coffeyville Community College before transferring to Wichita State University. Mills attended I.M. Terrell High School in Fort Worth, Texas. He was also a member of the Denver Broncos and Chicago Bears.

References

External links
Just Sports Stats

Living people
1942 births
American Football League All-Star players
American Football League players
American football wide receivers
Buffalo Bills players
Chicago Bears players
Coffeyville Red Ravens football players
Denver Broncos (AFL) players
People from Calvert, Texas
Players of American football from Texas
Wichita State Shockers football players